This local electoral calendar for 2014 lists the subnational elections held in 2014. Referendums, retention elections, and national by-elections (special elections) are also included.

January
7 January: Israel, 
10–11 January: Czech Republic, Zlín district 80, Senate by-election (1st round)
11 January: Nigeria, Anambra, Local Government Councils and Chairmen
14 January: Tuvalu, Nanumanga, Parliament by-election
17–18 January: Czech Republic, Zlín district 80, Senate by-election (2nd round)
18 January: 
Maldives, City Councils, Atoll Councils and Island Councils (1st round)
Nigeria, Jigawa, Local Government Councils and Chairmen
23 January: 
Pakistan, NA-69, National Assembly by-election
United Kingdom, Scotland, Cowdenbeath, Scottish Parliament by-election
26 January: Bangladesh, Narayanganj-5, House of the Nation by-election

February
1 February: United States, New Orleans, Mayor and City Council (1st round)
2 February: 
Japan, Nagasaki, Governor
Moldova, Gagauzia, 
8 February: Australia, Griffith, House of Representatives by-election
9 February: 
Japan, Tokyo, Governor
Switzerland
Basel-Landschaft, 
Basel-Stadt, 
Bern, 
Fribourg, 
Geneva, referendums
Glarus, Executive Council
Grisons, 
Lucerne, 
Solothurn, 
Ticino, referendum
Uri, 
Zürich, 
Zürich City, 
11 February: United States, San Diego, Mayor special election (2nd round)
13 February: United Kingdom, Wythenshawe and Sale East, House of Commons by-election
15 February: Maldives, City Councils, Atoll Councils and Island Councils (2nd round)
16 February: Italy, Sardinia, Regional Council
19 February: 
Bangladesh, Sub-district Councils (1st phase)
Cook Islands, Murienua, Parliament by-election
20 February: Bangladesh, Rangpur-6, House of the Nation by-election
23 February: 
Ecuador, 
Japan, Yamaguchi, 
Kosovo, North Kosovo, North Mitrovica, Mayor
24 February: India, Meghalaya
Jaintia Hills Autonomous District, Council
Khasi Hills Autonomous District, Council
25 February: 
Nigeria, Plateau, Local Government Councils and Chairmen
Zambia, Katuba, Parliament by-election
27 February: Bangladesh, Sub-district Councils (2nd phase)

March
2 March: Nicaragua
North Caribbean Coast Autonomous Region, Regional Council
South Caribbean Coast Autonomous Region, Regional Council
4 March: United States, Oklahoma City, Mayor
5 March: 
Indonesia, Padang, 
Jersey, Saint Helier No. 1 and 2, Parliament by-elections
9 March: 
Austria, Salzburg, 
Switzerland, Obwalden, Executive Council and Cantonal Council
11 March: United States, Florida's 13th congressional district, U.S. House of Representatives special election
15 March: 
Australia
South Australia, House of Assembly and Legislative Council
Tasmania, House of Assembly
Bangladesh, Sub-district Councils (3rd phase)
United States, New Orleans, City Council (2nd round)
16 March: 
Germany, Bavaria, 
Munich, 
Nuremberg, 
Japan, Ishikawa, 
Serbia, Belgrade, City Assembly
Tanzania, Kalenga, Parliament by-election
18 March: Switzerland, Appenzell Ausserrhoden, 
19 March: Netherlands, Municipal Councils
22 March: Nigeria, Nasarawa, Local Government Councils and Chairmen
23 March: 
Austria, Salzburg, 
Bangladesh, Sub-district Councils (4th phase)
Belarus, Regional Councils, District Councils and Municipal Councils
France
Municipal Councils (1st round)
Marseille, 
Paris, Council (1st round)
French Polynesia, 
New Caledonia, 
Saint Pierre and Miquelon, 
Japan, Osaka, 
Switzerland, Nidwalden, Executive Council and Landrat
29 March: 
Bangladesh, Tangail-8, House of the Nation by-election
Sri Lanka, Southern and Western, Provincial Councils
30 March: 
France
Municipal Councils (2nd round)
Marseille, 
Paris, Council (2nd round)
French Polynesia, 
New Caledonia, 
Germany, Bavaria, 
Munich, 
India, Andhra Pradesh, Municipal Corporations and Municipal Councils
Switzerland, Bern, Executive Council and Grand Council
Bernese Jura, 
Turkey, Mayors and Municipal Councils
Istanbul, Mayor
31 March: 
Bangladesh, Sub-district Councils (5th phase)
China, Wukan, Village Chief and Village Committee

April
1 April:United States, Anchorage, Assembly
5 April: 
Afghanistan, Provincial Councils
Australia, Western Australia, Australian Senate (revote)
Nigeria, Ilaje–Ese Odo, House of Representatives by-election
6 April: 
India, Andhra Pradesh, District Councils and Township Councils
Japan, Kyoto, Governor
Russia, Novosibirsk, 
Tanzania, Chalinze, Parliament by-election
7 April: Canada, Quebec, National Assembly
8 April: United States, Long Beach, Mayor and City Council (1st round)
9 April: 
India, Arunachal Pradesh, Legislative Assembly
Indonesia, Lampung, 
10 April: India, Odisha, Legislative Assembly (1st phase)
12 April: India, Sikkim, Legislative Assembly
16 April: Bangladesh, Tangail-8, House of the Nation by-election (revote in 1 constituency)
17 April: India, Odisha, Legislative Assembly (2nd phase)
19 April: Libya, Municipal Councils (1st phase)
26 April: Libya, Municipal Councils (2nd phase)
27 April: 
Japan, Kagoshima 2nd district, 
Switzerland, Appenzell Innerrhoden, Landsgemeinde
30 April: 
India, Telangana, Legislative Assembly
Iraq, Kurdistan Region, Provincial Councils

May
3 May: 
Australia, Tasmania, (Huon and Rosevears) Legislative Council
Libya, Municipal Councils (3rd phase)
4 May: 
Panama, Mayors and Municipal Councils
Switzerland, Glarus, 
6 May: 
Canada, Nunatsiavut, Assembly
Pakistan, NA-202, National Assembly by-election
7 May: 
India, Andhra Pradesh, Legislative Assembly
South Africa, Provincial Legislatures
10 May: 
Libya, Municipal Councils (4th phase)
United States, Arlington, City Council
11 May: New Caledonia, Provincial Assemblies
12 May: Pakistan, NA-46, National Assembly by-election
14–20 May: France, 
17 May: Nigeria, Kano, Local Government Councils and Chairmen
18 May: 
Greece, Regional Councils and Municipal Councils (1st round)
Switzerland
Aargau, 
Basel-Landschaft, 
Basel-Stadt, 
Bern, 
Geneva, referendums
Glarus, Council of States by-election
Grisons, Executive Council and Grand Council (1st round)
Lucerne, 
Neuchâtel, referendums
Schaffhausen, referendum
Solothurn, 
St. Gallen, 
Ticino, referendums
Vaud, referendum
Zürich, 
19 May: Bangladesh, Sub-district Councils (6th phase)
20 May: 
Malawi, Local Councils
United States
Arkansas, Supreme Court
Idaho, Supreme Court
Portland, City Commission
22 May: 
Tonga, Niuas Nobles' constituency, Parliament by-election
Uganda, Luweero, Parliament by-election
United Kingdom
England, Metropolitan Borough Councils, Unitary Authorities, District Councils and Mayors
Birmingham, City Council
Leeds, City Council
Liverpool, City Council
London, Mayors and Borough Councils
Manchester, City Council
Northern Ireland, District Councils
23 May: Ireland
City and County Councils
Dublin West and Longford–Westmeath, Assembly by-elections
24–25 May: France, 
25 May: 
Belgium
Brussels-Capital Region, Brussels Parliament
Eastern Belgium, German-speaking Community Parliament
Flanders, Flemish Parliament
Wallonia, Walloon Parliament
France, Haute-Garonne's 3rd constituency, National Assembly by-election (1st round)
Germany
Baden-Württemberg, 
Stuttgart Region, 
Stuttgart, 
Berlin, 
Brandenburg, 
Hamburg, 
Lower Saxony, Hanover Region, President (1st round)
Mecklenburg-Vorpommern, 
North Rhine-Westphalia, 
Cologne, 
Dortmund, 
Duisburg, 
Düsseldorf, 
Essen, 
Rhineland-Palatinate, 
Palatinate District Association, 
Saarland, 
Saxony, 
Dresden, 
Leipzig, 
Saxony-Anhalt, 
Thuringia, 
Greece, Regional Councils and Municipal Councils (2nd round)
Italy
Mayors and Municipal Councils (1st round)
Abruzzo, Regional Council
Piedmont, Regional Council
Malaysia, Bukit Gelugor, House of Representatives by-election
Poland, Kraków, 2022 Olymopics, Bicycle Paths, CCTV and Metro referendums
Ukraine
Ivano-Frankivsk constituency No. 83, Parliament by-election
City Mayors, Town Mayors, Village Mayors, City Councils, Urban-District Councils, Town Councils and Village Councils (1st phase)
Kyiv, Mayor and City Council
29 May: Pakistan, Balochistan, Metropolitan Corporations, Municipal Corporations, Municipal Committees, District Councils and Unions Councils (2nd phase)
31 May: 
Iceland, Municipal Councils
Malaysia, Teluk Intan, House of Representatives by-election

June
1 June: 
France, Haute-Garonne's 3rd constituency, National Assembly by-election (2nd round)
Switzerland, Glarus, Landrat
Turkey, Ağrı and Yalova, Mayors and Municipal Councils (revote)
3 June: United States
Fresno, City Council (1st round)
Long Beach, Mayor and City Council (2nd round)
Los Angeles County, Board of Supervisors (1st round)
Riverside County, Board of Supervisors
Sacramento, City Council (1st round)
San Bernardino County, Board of Supervisors (1st round)
San Diego County, Board of Supervisors
San Diego, City Council (1st round) and Referendums
Santa Clara County, Board of Supervisors
San Jose, Mayor and City Council (1st round)
4 June: South Korea, Governors, Provincial Councils, Mayors, Municipal Councils and School Boards
Busan, 
Incheon, 
Seoul, Mayor
5 June: United Kingdom, Newark, House of Commons by-election
8 June: 
Germany, Rhineland-Palatinate, 
Italy, Mayors and Municipal Councils (2nd round)
12 June: Canada, Ontario, Legislative Assembly
14 June: France, French Polynesia's 1st constituency, National Assembly by-election (1st round)
15 June: 
Bangladesh, Barisal-5, House of the Nation by-election
Georgia, Mayors and Municipal Councils
Germany
Lower Saxony, Hanover Region, President (2nd round)
North Rhine-Westphalia, 
Dortmund, 
Düsseldorf, 
Switzerland, Grisons, Grand Council (2nd round)
18 June: India, Uttarakhand, District Councils, Township Councils and Village Councils (1st phase)
21 June: 
India, Uttarakhand, District Councils, Township Councils and Village Councils (2nd phase)
Nigeria, Ekiti, Governor
22 June: France, Nord's 21st constituency, National Assembly by-election (1st round)
23 June: Kenya, Bonchari, National Assembly by-election
24 June: 
India, Uttarakhand, District Councils, Township Councils and Village Councils (3rd phase)
United States
Florida's 19th congressional district, U.S. House of Representatives special election
Tulsa, City Council (1st round)
26 June: Kuwait, Second District, Third District and Fourth District, National Assembly by-elections (5 seats)
28 June: France, French Polynesia's 1st constituency, National Assembly by-election (2nd round)
29 June: 
France
Nord's 21st constituency, National Assembly by-election (2nd round)
Saint-Pierre-et-Miquelon's 1st constituency, National Assembly by-election
Northern Cyprus, 
Senegal, 
30 June: Canada, Fort McMurray—Athabasca, Macleod, Trinity—Spadina and Scarborough—Agincourt, House of Commons by-elections

July
3–16 July: Germany, Bavaria, Free Choice of 8- or 9- Years of High School referendum
6 July: 
Mexico, State elections
Coahuila, 
Nayarit, 
Switzerland, Grisons, Grand Council (3rd round)
13 July: Japan, Shiga, Governor
15 July: India, Tripura, District Councils, Township Councils and Village Councils
30 July: South Korea, Busan Haeundae–Gijang 1, Daejeon Daedeok, Gwangju Gwangsan 2, Gyeonggi Gimpo, Gyeonggi Pyeongtaek 2, Gyeonggi Suwon 2, Gyeonggi Suwon 3, Gyeonggi Suwon 4, North Chungcheong Chungju, Seoul Dongjak 2, South Chungcheong Seosan–Taean, South Jeolla Damyang–Hampyeong–Yeonggwang–Jangseong, South Jeolla Naju–Hwasun, South Jeolla Suncheon–Gokseong and Ulsan Nam 2, National Assembly by-elections

August
2 August: Nigeria, Katsina, Local Government Councils and Chairmen
5 August: United States
Michigan, Eliminate Commercial and Industrial Property Tax referendum
Missouri, Farmers' and Ranchers' Rights, Protect Electronic Data from Unreasonable Searches and Seizures, and Right to Bear Arms constitutional referendums
7 August: United States, Tennessee, Supreme Court, Court of Appeals and Court of Criminal Appeals retention elections
9 August: 
Nigeria, Osun, Governor
United States, Honolulu, City Council (1st round)
10 August: Japan, Nagano, 
15 August: Samoa, Gagaʻifomauga, Parliament by-election
19 August: 
United States, Alaska, Oil Tax Cuts Veto referendum
Zambia, Mangango, Parliament by-election
26 August: United States
Orange County, CA, Board of Supervisors (1st round)
Mesa, Mayor and City Council
Miami-Dade County, County Commission
29 August: Madagascar, Ambanja, Belo sur Tsiribihina, Marovoay and Sainte Marie, National Assembly by-elections
31 August: 
Germany, Saxony, Parliament
Japan, Kagawa, Governor

September
7 September: Poland, senatorial constituencies No. 47, 73 and 82, 
11 September: Zambia, Kasenengwa, Mkushi South, Solwezi Central, Vubwi and Zambezi West, Parliament by-elections
13 September: India, Mainpuri, Medak and Vadodara, House of the People by-elections
14 September: 
Germany
Brandenburg, Parliament
Thuringia, Parliament
Russia, 
Altai Krai, 
Altai Republic,  and State Assembly
Astrakhan Oblast, 
Bashkortostan, 
Bryansk Oblast, 
Chelyabinsk Oblast, 
Crimea, State Council
Ivanovo Oblast, 
Kabardino-Balkaria, Parliament
Kalmykia, Head special election
Karachay-Cherkessia, 
Khabarovsk Krai, 
Kirov Oblast, 
Komi Republic, 
Krasnoyarsk Krai, 
Kurgan Oblast, 
Kursk Oblast, 
Lipetsk Oblast, 
Mari El, 
Moscow, City Duma
Murmansk Oblast, Governor special election
Nenets Autonomous Okrug,  and 
Nizhny Novgorod Oblast, 
Novosibirsk Oblast, Governor special election
Orenburg Oblast, 
Oryol Oblast, 
Primorsky Krai, Governor special election
Pskov Oblast, 
Saint Petersburg, 
Sakha, Head special election
Samara Oblast, 
Sevastopol, 
Stavropol Krai, 
Tatarstan, State Council
Tula Oblast, 
Tuva, Great Parliament
Tyumen Oblast, 
Udmurtia, 
Volgograd Oblast,  and 
Vologda Oblast, 
Voronezh Oblast, Governor
Sweden, County Councils and Municipal Councils
18 September: United Kingdom, Scotland, Independence Referendum
19 September: Tuvalu, Nanumea, Parliament by-election
19–20 September: Czech Republic, Prague 10, Senate by-election (1st round)
20 September: Sri Lanka, Uva, Provincial Council
21 September: Austria, Vorarlberg, Parliament
22 September: Canada, New Brunswick, Legislative Assembly
26–27 September: Czech Republic, Prague 10, Senate by-election (2nd round)
28 September: 
Republic of the Congo, Departmental Councils and Municipal Councils
Switzerland
Aargau, 
Basel-Landschaft, 
Basel-Stadt, 
Geneva, referendum
Grisons, 
Jura, referendum
Nidwalden, referendum
Obwalden, referendum
Schaffhausen, referendums
Solothurn, 
St. Gallen, 
Ticino, referendums
Uri, 
Zürich,

October
5 October: 
Brazil,  and 
Peru, 
Slovenia, 
Switzerland, Zug,  and 
7 October: Malawi, Blantyre North and Thyolo East, Parliament by-elections
9 October: United Kingdom, Clacton and Heywood and Middleton, House of Commons by-elections
10 October: Ireland, Dublin South-West and Roscommon–South Leitrim, Assembly by-elections
10–11 October: Czech Republic, Municipal Councils
11 October: Nigeria, Adamawa, Governor by-election
12 October: 
Bosnia and Herzegovina
Federation of Bosnia and Herzegovina, House of Representatives and Cantonal Assemblies
Republika Srpska, President and National Assembly
Hungary, Mayors, County Assemblies and Municipal Assemblies
Budapest, Mayor and Assembly
São Tomé and Príncipe, 
Príncipe, 
14–28 October: Australia, Tasmania, Mayors, Deputy Mayors and Local Councils
15 October: 
India
Beed and Kandhamal, House of the People by-elections
Haryana, Legislative Assembly 
Maharashtra, Legislative Assembly
Mozambique, Governors and Provincial Assemblies
16 October: Pakistan, NA-149, National Assembly by-election
19 October: Slovenia, 
20-26 October: Argentina, Misiones, Dam referendum
20 October – 7 November: Australia, South Australia, Mayors, District Councils, Regional Councils, City Councils, Town Councils and Aboriginal Councils
21 October: China, Laizhou, Pinglidian, Shizhulan, Village Committee (1st round)
22 October: Canada, Manitoba, Mayors, Municipal Councils and School Boards
23 October: Switzerland, Valais, 
24 October: Botswana, District Councils, City Councils and Town Councils
25 October: Nigeria, Delta, Local Authority Councils and Chairs
26 October: 
Brazil, 
Japan, Fukushima, 
Serbia, 
Ukraine, City Mayors, Town Mayors, Village Mayors, City Councils, Urban-District Councils, Town Councils and Village Councils (2nd phase)
27 October: Canada, Ontario, County Councils, Mayors, Regional Councils, Reeves, District Councils and School Boards
Toronto, Mayor, City Council and School Boards
30 October: United Kingdom, South Yorkshire Police and Crime Commissioner by-election

November
3 November: Canada, Prince Edward Island, Mayors and Charlottetown City Council
4 November:
Federated States of Micronesia
Kosrae, Governor (1st round), Lieutenant Governor and State Legislature
Yap, Governor and State Legislature
Northern Mariana Islands, Mayors, Municipal Councils and Boards of Education
United States, Midterm elections
New Jersey's 1st congressional district, U.S. House of Representatives special election
North Carolina's 12th congressional district, U.S. House of Representatives special election
Virginia's 7th congressional district, U.S. House of Representatives special election
Hawaii, U.S. Senate special election
Oklahoma, U.S. Senate special election
South Carolina, U.S. Senate special election
Navajo Nation, Board of Education, Board of Election Supervisors and Council
Washington, D.C., Mayor, Attorney General and Council
Alabama
Governor, Lieutenant Governor, Attorney General, Auditor, Commissioner of Agriculture and Industries, Public Service Commission, Secretary of State and Treasurer
House of Representatives and Senate
Prohibit Recognition of Foreign Law and Laws Violating State Policies, Right to Bear Arms, Right to Hunt and Fish, and Two-Thirds State Legislature Majority to Increase Local Education Expenditures constitutional referendums
Alaska
Governor
House of Representatives and Senate
Supreme Court retention election
Legalize Marijuana, Minimum Wage and Protect Salmon from Mining referendums
Arizona
Governor, Attorney General, Corporation Commission, Mine Inspector, Secretary of State, Superintendent of Public Instruction and Treasurer
House of Representatives and Senate
Court of Appeals retention elections
Rejection of Unconstitutional Federal Actions constitutional referendum
Arkansas
Governor, Lieutenant Governor, Attorney General, Auditor, Commissioner of State Lands, Secretary of State and Treasurer
House of Representatives and Senate
Ballot Measure Signature Requirements, Extend Legislators' Term Limits and Restrict Lobbying and Campaign Finances, Legislative Review and Approval of Changes to State Agencies' Administrative Rules, and Statewide Legalization of Alcohol constitutional referendums and Minimum Wage referendum
California
Governor, Lieutenant Governor, Attorney General, Board of Equalization, Controller, Insurance Commissioner, Secretary of State, Superintendent of Public Instruction and Treasurer
Assembly and Senate
Supreme Court and Court of Appeals retention elections
Recategorize Nonviolent Offenses as Misdemeanors referendum
Bakersfield, City Council
Fresno, City Council (2nd round)
Los Angeles County, Board of Supervisors (2nd round)
Oakland, Mayor and City Council
Orange County, Board of Supervisors (2nd round)
Sacramento, City Council (2nd round)
San Bernardino County, Board of Supervisors (2nd round)
San Diego, City Council (2nd round)
San Francisco, Board of Supervisors
San Jose, Mayor and City Council (2nd round)
Colorado
Governor, Attorney General, Secretary of State and Treasurer
House of Representatives and Senate
Supreme Court and Court of Appeals retention elections
Abortion constitutional referendum, and Open School Board Meetings for Collective Bargaining and Genetically Modified Organisms Food Labels referendums
Connecticut
Governor, Attorney General, Comptroller, Secretary of the State and Treasurer
House of Representatives and Senate
Early Voting constitutional referendum
Delaware
Attorney General, Auditor and Treasurer
House of Representatives and Senate
Florida
Governor, Attorney General, Chief Financial Officer and Commissioner of Agriculture
House of Representatives and Senate
District Courts of Appeal retention elections
Medical Marijuana and Judicial Vacancies constitutional referendums
Broward County, Commission
Georgia
Governor, Lieutenant Governor, Attorney General, Commissioner of Agriculture, Commissioner of Insurance, Commissioner of Labor, Public Service Commission, Secretary of State and Superintendent of Schools
House of Representatives and Senate
Hawaii
Hawaii and Office of Hawaiian Affairs Board of Trustees
House of Representatives and Senate
Honolulu, City Council (2nd round)
Idaho
Governor, Lieutenant Governor, Attorney General, Controller, Secretary of State, Treasurer and Superintendent of Public Instruction
House of Representatives and Senate
Legislative Delegation of Rulemaking constitutional referendum
Illinois
Governor, Attorney General, Comptroller, Secretary of State and Treasurer
House of Representatives and Senate
Supreme Court and Appellate Court retention elections, and Appellate Court
Crime Victims' Rights and Right to Vote constitutional referendums
Cook County, Assessor, Board of Commissioners, Board of Commissioners President, Board of Review, Clerk, Sheriff, Treasurer and Water Reclamation District Board
Indiana
Auditor, Secretary of State and Treasurer
House of Representatives and Senate
Supreme Court and Court of Appeals retention elections
Iowa
Governor, Attorney General, Auditor, Secretary of Agriculture, Secretary of State and Treasurer
House of Representatives and Senate
Court of Appeals retention elections
Kansas
Governor, Attorney General, Commissioner of Insurance, Secretary of State and Treasurer
House of Representatives
Supreme Court and Court of Appeals retention elections
Kentucky
House of Representatives and Senate
Supreme Court and Court of Appeals
Louisville, Mayor and Metropolitan Council
Louisiana
Public Service Commission
Maine
Governor
House of Representatives and Senate
Maryland
Governor, Attorney General and Comptroller
House of Delegates and Senate
Court of Appeals and Court of Special Appeals retention elections
Massachusetts
Governor, Attorney General, Auditor, Governor's Council, Secretary of the Commonwealth and Treasurer
House of Representatives and Senate
Automatic Gas Tax Increase Repeal, Expansion of Bottle Deposits, Expansion of Gambling Prohibition and Paid Sick Days referendums
Michigan
Governor, Attorney General and Secretary of State
House of Representatives and Senate
Supreme Court
Wayne County, Executive and Commission
Minnesota
Governor, Attorney General, Auditor and Secretary of State
House of Representatives
Supreme Court
Mississippi
Right to Hunt and Fish constitutional referendum
Missouri
Auditor
House of Representatives and Senate
Supreme Court and Court of Appeals retention elections
Child Sexual Abuse Trials, Performance Evaluation for Teachers' Pay Raises and Six-Day Early Voting Period constitutional referendums
Montana
Public Service Commission
House of Representatives and Senate
Supreme Court
Late Voter Registration referendum
Nebraska
Governor, Attorney General, Auditor, Public Service Commission, Secretary of State and Treasurer
Legislature
Supreme Court and Court of Appeals retention elections
Minimum Wage referendum
Nevada
Governor, Lieutenant Governor, Attorney General, Controller, Secretary of State and Treasurer
Assembly and Senate
Supreme Court
Create an Intermediate Appellate Court and Removing Mining Tax Cap constitutional referendums
Clark County, County Commission
New Hampshire
Governor and Executive Council
House of Representatives and Senate
New Jersey
Pretrial Detention constitutional referendum
New Mexico
Governor, Attorney General, Auditor, Commissioner of Public Lands, Public Education Commission, Public Regulation Commission, Secretary of State and Treasurer
House of Representatives
Supreme Court and Court of Appeals retention elections, and Court of Appeals
Student on Board of Regents constitutional referendum
New York
Governor, Attorney General and Comptroller
Assembly and Senate
Redistricting Commission constitutional referendum
North Carolina
House of Representatives and Senate
Supreme Court and Court of Appeals
North Dakota
Agriculture Commissioner, Attorney General, Public Service Commission, Secretary of State and Tax Commissioner
House of Representatives and Senate
Abolish Elections for the Commission of Higher Education, Life Begins at Conception, Prohibit Mortgage or Sales or Transfer Taxes on Real Property, Require Voter Approval for Measures Estimated to have a Significant Fiscal Impact, and Use Oil Tax for Conservation constitutional referendums, and Parental Rights referendum
Ohio
Governor, Attorney General, Auditor, Secretary of State and Treasurer
House of Representatives and Senate
Supreme Court and District Courts of Appeal
Oklahoma
Governor, Lieutenant Governor, Attorney General, Auditor, Corporation Commissioner, Commissioner of Insurance, Commissioner of Labor, Superintendent of Public Instruction and Treasurer
House of Representatives and Senate
Supreme Court, Court of Criminal Appeals and Court of Civil Appeals retention elections
Tulsa, City Council (2nd round)
Oregon
Governor and Commissioner of Labor
House of Representatives and Senate
Allow Judges to Teach in Universities and Serve in the National Guard, Fund to Aid Post-Secondary Students and Outlaw Gender Discrimination constitutional referendums, and Driver's Licenses for Those Without Legal Residence, Labels for Genetically Engineered Foods, Legalize Marijuana and Open Top-Two Primary System referendums
Pennsylvania
Governor
House of Representatives and Senate
Rhode Island
Governor, Lieutenant Governor, Attorney General, Secretary of State and Treasurer
House of Representatives and Senate
Constitutional Convention referendum
South Carolina
Governor, Adjutant General, Attorney General, Commissioner of Agriculture, Comptroller, Secretary of State, Superintendent of Education and Treasurer
House of Representatives
Appointed Adjutant General constitutional referendum
South Dakota
Governor, Attorney General, Auditor, Commissioner of School and Public Lands, Public Utilities Commission, Secretary of State and Treasurer
House of Representatives and Senate
Supreme Court retention elections
Health Insurance Choice and Minimum Wage referendums
Tennessee
Governor
House of Representatives and Senate
Abortion, Appointment of Judges, Permit Lotteries and Prohibit State Payroll and Income Taxes constitutional referendums
Texas
Governor, Lieutenant Governor, Attorney General, Commissioner of Agriculture, Commissioner of the General Land Office, Comptroller and Railroad Commissioner
House of Representatives and Senate
Supreme Court, Court of Criminal Appeals and Courts of Appeals
Austin, Mayor and City Council (1st round)
Bexar County, Commissioners Court
Dallas County, Commissioners Court
Harris County, Commissioners Court
Tarrant County, Commissioners Court
Utah
Attorney General special election
House of Representatives and Senate
Supreme Court and Court of Appeals retention elections
Vermont
Governor, Lieutenant Governor, Attorney General, Auditor, Secretary of State and Treasurer
House of Representatives and Senate
Virginia
Virginia Beach, City Council
Washington
House of Representatives and Senate
Supreme Court
Gun Background Checks, Gun Confiscations and Class Size Reduction referendums
West Virginia
House of Delegates and Senate
Wisconsin
Governor, Attorney General, Secretary of State and Treasurer
Assembly and Senate
Wyoming
Governor, Auditor, Secretary of State, Superintendent of Public Instruction and Treasurer
House of Representatives and Senate
Supreme Court retention elections
9 November: Spain, Catalonia, Self-Determination referendum
11 November: Cook Islands, Mitiaro, Parliament by-election
14 November: China, Laizhou, Pinglidian, Shizhulan, Village Committee (2nd round)
15 November: 
Canada, British Columbia, Mayors and Municipal Councils
Vancouver, Mayor, Park Board, School Board and City Council
Slovakia, 
16 November: 
Japan
Ehime, 
Okinawa, Governor
Poland, Provincial Assemblies, County Councils, Commune Councils and Commune Heads (1st round)
17 November: Canada, Whitby—Oshawa and Yellowhead, House of Commons by-elections
18 November: 
Bermuda, Sandys South, House of Assembly by-election
Saint Helena, Ascension and Tristan da Cunha, Ascension Island, Council by-election
20 November: 
Uganda, Amuru, Parliament by-election
United Kingdom, Rochester and Strood, House of Commons by-election
22 November: 
Bahrain, Municipal Councils (1st round)
Guernsey, Alderney, Parliament
India, Rajasthan, Municipal Corporations, Municipal Councils and Town Councils
23 November: 
Hungary, Budapest 11, 
Italy
Calabria, Regional Council
Emilia-Romagna, Regional Council
Turkmenistan, Regional Councils and District Councils
25 November: India
Jammu and Kashmir, Legislative Assembly (1st phase)
Jharkhand, Legislative Assembly (1st phase)
26 November: India, Rajasthan, Municipal Chairs
27 November: India, Rajasthan, Municipal Deputy Chairs
28 November: India, Madhya Pradesh, Municipal Corporations, Municipal Councils and Town Councils (1st phase)
29 November: 
Australia, Victoria, Legislative Assembly and Legislative Council
Bahrain, Municipal Councils (2nd round)
Jordan, Irbid's 2nd district, House of Representatives by-election
Taiwan, County Magistrates, County Councils, Township Mayors, Township Councils, Municipal Mayors, Municipal Councils, Borough Chiefs, Indigenous District Chiefs and Indigenous District Councillors
30 November: 
Japan, Wakayama, Governor
Poland, Commune Heads (2nd round)
San Marino, Mayors and Municipal Councils
Switzerland
Appenzell Ausserrhoden, 
Basel-Stadt, 
Geneva, referendums
Grisons, 
Lucerne, 
Neuchâtel, referendums
Obwalden, referendum
Schaffhausen, referendums
Schwyz, 
Solothurn, 
St. Gallen, 
Zürich,

December
1 December: Jamaica, Westmoreland Central, House of Representatives by-election
2 December: India
Jammu and Kashmir, Legislative Assembly (2nd phase)
Jharkhand, Legislative Assembly (2nd phase)
Madhya Pradesh, Municipal Corporations, Municipal Councils and Town Councils (2nd phase)
6 December: United States, Louisiana
U.S. Senate (2nd round)
Louisiana's 5th congressional district, U.S. House of Representatives (2nd round)
Louisiana's 6th congressional district, U.S. House of Representatives (2nd round)
7 December: 
France, Aube's 3rd constituency, National Assembly by-election (1st round)
Peru, 
8 December: China, Laizhou, Pinglidian, Shizhulan, Village Chief (election nullified)
9 December: India
Jammu and Kashmir, Legislative Assembly (3rd phase)
Jharkhand, Legislative Assembly (3rd phase) 
10 December: Guernsey, Sark, Parliament
13 December: China, Xinxiang, Yanjin, Beijie, Village Chief
14 December: 
France, Aube's 3rd constituency, National Assembly by-election (2nd round)
India
Jammu and Kashmir, Legislative Assembly (4th phase)
Jharkhand, Legislative Assembly (4th phase)
Japan, Ibaraki, 
Tanzania, Municipal Councils and Street/Village Chairs
16 December: United States, Austin, Mayor and City Council (2nd round)
17 December: Sint Eustatius, Status referendum
20 December: India
Jammu and Kashmir, Legislative Assembly (5th phase)
Jharkhand, Legislative Assembly (5th phase)
21 December: 
Japan, Miyazaki, Governor
Uzbekistan, Regional Councils, District Councils and City Councils (1st round)
23 December: 
Azerbaijan, Municipal Councils
Bangladesh, Sirajganj-3, House of the Nation by-election
27 December: Myanmar, Yangon, City Development Committee
31 December: Pakistan, Balochistan, Metropolitan Corporations, Municipal Corporations, Municipal Committees, District Councils and Unions Councils (3rd phase)

References

2014 elections
2014
Political timelines of the 2010s by year
local